

Abbot is an English surname derived from the word "abbot". It is a spelling variant of the more common name Abbott. Notable people with this surname include:

A 
 Abiel Abbot (1770–1828), American pastor

B 
 Bec Abbot, Canadian singer
 Benjamin Abbot (1762–1849), American schoolteacher
 Brian Abbot (1911–1936), Australian actor

C 
 Charles Abbot (botanist) (1761–1817), British botanist and entomologist
 Charles Abbot, 1st Baron Colchester (1757–1829), British statesman
 Charles Abbot, 2nd Baron Colchester (1798–1867), British Conservative politician
 Charles Greeley Abbot (1872–1973), American astrophysicist, astronomer and fifth secretary of the Smithsonian Institution
 Charles S. Abbot (born 1945), American naval admiral
 Courtney Abbot (born 1989), New Zealand-born actress

D 
Dorian Abbot, American geophysicist

E 
 Edwin Hale Abbot (1834–1927), American lawyer and railroad executive
 Ezra Abbot (1819–1884), American Biblical scholar

F 
 Francis Ellingwood Abbot (1836–1903), American philosopher and theologian

G 
 George Abbot (author) (c. 1603–1648), English writer
 George Abbot (bishop) (1562–1633), English clergyman

H 
 Henry Abbot (martyr) (died 1597), English Catholic martyr
 Henry Larcom Abbot (1831–1927), American military engineer
 Hugh the Abbot (died 886)

J 
 Joel Abbot (naval officer) (1793–1855), American naval officer
 Joel Abbot (politician) (1776–1826), American politician from Georgia
 John Abbot (entomologist) (1751–1840/1), American entomologist
 John Stevens Cabot Abbott (1805–1877), American historian, pastor and pedagogical writer
 Jude Abbott (born 1962), British musician

L 
 Laura Abbot (born 1930s), American writer
 Lillian Elvira Moore Abbot (1870–1944), American painter

M 
 Maurice Abbot (1565–1642), English merchant and politician

N 
 Nick Abbot (born 1960), British radio presenter

R 
 Richard Abbot (1818–1904), English poet
 Robert Abbot (bishop) (1560–1617), Bishop of Salisbury
 Robert Abbot (theologian) (1588?–1662?), Puritan theologian
 Russ Abbot (born 1947), English musician, comedian and actor

S 
 Samuel Abbot (1786–1839), American inventor
 Stuart Abbot (born 1986), Scottish footballer

T 
 Theophilus C. Abbot (1826–1892), American college president

W 
 William Abbot (1790–1843), English actor
 William Wright Abbot (1922–2009), American historian, educator, and writer
 Willis J. Abbot (1863–1934), American journalist and writer

References 

Occupational surnames
English-language surnames
English-language occupational surnames